Lundenes is a village in Harstad Municipality in Troms og Finnmark county, Norway. Lundenes Church is located in the village.

References

Harstad
Villages in Troms